Shillelagh is a village in County Wicklow, Ireland. It is located in the south of the county, on the R725 regional road from Carlow to Gorey. The River Derry, a tributary of the River Slaney, flows through the village, while the Wicklow Way passes to the north and west.

The village was planned as part of the FitzWilliam estate in the 17th century. In 2016, it had a population of 337.

Sport
Shillelagh has a Gaelic Athletic Association team and a soccer team. The team colours are sky blue and navy. Coollattin Golf Club, an 18-hole parkland course, is located just east of the village.

Transport
Shillelagh railway station opened on 22 May 1865, at the end of a branch from Woodenbridge via Aughrim and Tinahely. It closed to passengers and goods traffic on 24 April 1944, and altogether on 20 April 1945. The station building was subsequently converted to a private residence.

References

External links
 A Wee Look at the History of County Wicklow Information about the FitzWilliam Estate.
 Shillelagh at Wicklow Tourism
 Shillelagh GAA information at Wicklow GAA

Towns and villages in County Wicklow